Rosebud is an American literary magazine headquartered in Rockdale, Wisconsin. It was founded in 1993 by John Lehman, Publisher, Roderick Clark, Chief Editor, and Tom Pomplun, Art Director. Lehman retired from publication duties in 1998 but remains Editor-at-Large. Roderick Clark is Rosebud's current publisher and managing editor. The magazine is published three times a year, and places an emphasis on its reading and enjoyment as printed material, though it does maintain an online presence.

History 
Lehman first approached Clark in 1992 to help create a magazine with short stories that would be distributed from coast to coast. The first issue of Rosebud appeared in November 1993, the second issue in June 1994, having subsequent issues published each year without interruption. Usually, there have been three, sometimes two, issues published each year. Though the magazine's emphasis is on encouraging emerging writers, Rosebud has published well-known writers as well

Contributors 
Rosebud publishes a mix of established and emerging writers, as well as featuring the work of fine and graphic artists. Doug Moe, reporter for The Wisconsin State Journal, said in his review of Rosebud, "The writing has consistently shined, with the odd big name flavoring the mix." Following is a partial list of notable contributors.

Achebe, Chinua
Algren, Nelson
Baxter, Charles
Bierce, Ambrose
Blei, Norbert 
Bly, Robert
Bockman, Janine Gordon
Bradbury, Ray
Brooks, Gwendolyn
Bruchac, Joseph
Castle, Mort
Chan, David Marshall
Christensen, Thomas
Cisneros, Sandra
Crumb, Robert
De Shields,André
Dick, Philip K.
Ferlinghetti, Lawrence
Gardner, John
Ginsberg, Allen
Gioia, Dana
Hamilton, Jane
Heaney, Seamus
Hemingway, Ernest
Hempel, Amy
Hughes, Frieda
Jackson, Michael
Kennedy, X.J.
Kilcher, Jewel
Kinsella, W.P.
Langton, Daniel
Lansdale, Joe R.
Le Guin, Ursula K.
Levertov, Denise
Levine, Philip
Mailer, Norman
Maranhao, Salgado
McCartney, Paul
McGovern, Ann
Mitchard, Jacquelyn
Morrison, Jim
Nimoy, Leonard
Novakovich, Josip
Percy, Benjamin
Perry, Michael
Pickering, Samuel F.
Pierre-Roché	, Henri
Pinsky, Robert
Raab, Diana
Royko, Mike
Shepard, Sam
Shivani, Anis
Smelcer, John
Smith, Clark Ashton
Snyder, Gary
Stafford, William
Stone, Ruth
Strand, Mark
Terkel, Studds
Thomas, Aeronwy
Thomas, B. J.
Tutu, Desmond (Bishop)
Updike, John
Valente, José Ángel
Vukcevich, Ray
Vukelich, George
Walker, Alice
Weaver, Gordon
Wilbur, Richard
Wildgen, Michelle
Wiesel, Elie
Wisniewski, Mark
Wojtyla, Karol Jozef (Pope John Paul II)
Liu Xiaobo
Zapruder, Matthew
Zeldis, Chayym

Subject-matter and style 
Subject-matter that was initially conservative in content and tone has changed to include more unconventional submissions. As of 2015, Rosebud embraces both the more traditional and established genres in literature, as well as advant-garde pieces.

"Rosebud embraced all genres, but the one constant is stellar prose that grips the reader within the first paragraph."

Visually, the magazine is illustrated with images, artwork, graphics, and calligraphy. Sir Paul McCartney's artwork was featured on the front cover of Rosebud Issue 34  and Toni Pawlowsky's art is featured throughout Issue 60, as well as gracing the front cover with "Dog Walker" and back with "She Took That Elephant Everywhere."

Format 
Rosebud is organized as an anthology magazine featuring fiction, non-fiction, short stories, essays, poetry and featured art, sometimes reviews, as well as behind-the-scenes insights from writers, artists and poets on their creative process. Each issue is formatted to contain five rotating tonal groups, for example, a female multi-role theme of "Mothers, Daughters, Wives" or, again, a compound theme of "Overtime," which included working, working overtime, and over working. Tonal groups contain stories, articles, profiles and poems with themes of love, alienation, travel, humor, nostalgia and unexpected revelation, all punctuated by showcased artwork.

"Among Rosebud’s hallmarks is a blurb accompanying each story or poem describing the origin of the piece or the author’s intention for creating it—‘like a window into the interior landscape of the writer,’ says Shoshauna Shy, whose work has appeared in the magazine."

Educational outreach and awards 
During the school year, Rosebud is either subscribed by or donated to many schools and colleges, sometimes being used as an example of what an unconventional literary magazine looks and reads like. In addition, issues are regularly sent to urban and rural libraries. As a third method of outreach, complimentary copies are given for free to institutions housing residents.

Alongside its educational efforts to encourage literacy and reading, Rosebud recognizes fine writers and poets with several annual awards.

Organization and directors 
Rosebud, Inc. is a non-profit, Wisconsin educational corporation, recognized by the IRS in 1994 as a 501(c)(3) tax-exempt organization. The founding board of directors was composed of: John Lehman, Roderick Clark and Tom Pomplun. As of 2015, the board of directors consists of: Roderick Clark, president and treasurer; Johnny Smelcer, vice president; Brian Soper, secretary; and Parnell Nelson, director.

Subscription-base and distribution 
Rosebud is a subscription-based periodical publication with direct mailing to subscribers from its headquarters in Wisconsin. It has a circulation of about 6,000, "a massive number for a small literary journal." The national bookstore and newsstand distribution of all copies is handled by Ingram Content Group. Rosebud is sold in large chain-bookstores and many independent book retailers throughout the United States and Canada. The magazine is available to schools and libraries through EBSCO and Turner Subscription Agency, Inc. It is also available in public and university libraries.

Affiliations and sustainability 
Rosebud is sustained almost entirely by subscriptions, bookstore sales and small donations from readers. Rosebud pays writers for each story, poem and article in addition to offering annual awards.

Rosebud has been and is a member of several professional organizations, including the Association of Independent Publishers, Council of Small Literary Magazines and the American Booksellers Association. Articles about its work have appeared in the Milwaukee Journal Sentinel, Wisconsin State Journal, Boston Globe, Baltimore Sun and Library Journal.

On January 25, 2016 and regarding sequel films to "Fifty Shades of Grey,' namely :Fifty Shades Darker" and "Fifty Shades Freed," Universal Pictures requested permission from Clark "to use several issues of 'Rosebud' magazine as set dressing in scenes throughout the film , in order to help achieve professional authenticity, as some scenes as set in a publishing firm." Clark granted permission the following day.

Namesake and tagline 
"The magazine's name, with its allusion to ‘Citizen Kane,’ was Lehman's idea.

Rosebud’s tagline was "The Magazine for People Who Enjoy Good Writing," and is now "The Biggest Little Literary Magazine in the World."

References

External links 
http://www.rsbd.net/NEW/index.php, Rosebud's website
https://www.facebook.com/RosebudMag/
https://twitter.com/Rosebudmag
http://www.rosebudbookreviews.com/

Dane County, Wisconsin
Magazines published in Wisconsin